Tamás Csilus (born 8 May 1995) is a Hungarian football player. He plays for Nyíregyháza Spartacus FC in the Hungarian NB II.
He played his first league match in 2013.

He is the twin brother of Ádám Csilus, who is also a footballer.

Club statistics

Updated to games played as of 6 July 2017.

Honours
Ferencváros
Hungarian League Cup (1): 2012–13

References

1995 births
Living people
People from Ócsa
Hungarian footballers
Association football midfielders
Nemzeti Bajnokság I players
Nemzeti Bajnokság II players
Ferencvárosi TC footballers
Lombard-Pápa TFC footballers
Kisvárda FC players
Soroksári TE footballers
Nyíregyháza Spartacus FC players
BFC Siófok players
Szombathelyi Haladás footballers
Sportspeople from Pest County
21st-century Hungarian people